The Diocese of Lahore may refer to:

Anglican Diocese of Lahore
 the former Roman Catholic Diocese of Lahore, 1886 until 1994 when it was elevated to an archdiocese